Firefish may refer to the following groups or species of fish:

 Nemateleotris, a genus of the family dartfish, Ptereleotridae
 Elegant firefish, purple firefish, Nemateleotris decora
 Nemateleotris magnifica, fire goby, fire fish, fire dartfish, red fire goby
 Scorpaenidae, firefish, turkeyfish, dragonfish, stingfish
 Pterois, a genus of venomous marine fish
 Devil firefish, common lionfish, Pterois miles
 Clearfin lionfish, radial firefish, tailbar lionfish, radiata lionfish, Pterois radiata
 Broadbarred firefish, Pterois antennata
 Blackfoot firefish, Parapterois heterurus